James William Davis (1846, Leeds-1893) was a British naturalist who specialised in fossil fish. He lived at Chevinedge, Halifax in Yorkshire.
James William Davis was a leading member of the Yorkshire Naturalists' Union and a Fellow of the Geological Society of London.

Works
partial list

Davis, J.W. (1879) Description of a new species of fossil fish spine, Ctenacanthus minor, from the Lower Coal-Measures of Yorkshire. Geological Magazine, decade 2, 6: 531–532
Davis, J.W. (1880) On the fish fauna of the Yorkshire Coal Field. Proceedings of the Geologists' Association, 6 (8): 359–370 
Davis, J. W. (1880) On a new species of Gyracanthus, a fossil fish from the Coal-Measures. Annals and Magazine of Natural History 6:372-373. Online here
Davis, J.W. (1880) On the genus Pleuracanthus, Agass., including Orthacanthus, Agass., and Gold., Diplodus, Agass., and Xenacanthus, Beyr. Quarterly Journal of the Geological Society of London, 36: 321–336 Online here
Davis, J.W. (1880) On the fish-remains found in the Cannel Coal in the Middle Coal-Measures of the West Riding of Yorkshire, with the description of some new species. Quarterly Journal of the Geological Society of London, 36: 56–67 online here
Davis, J.W. (1880) On the fish fauna of the Yorkshire Coal Field. Proceedings of the Geologists' Association, 6 (8): 359–370 
Davis, J.W. (1881) On the genera Ctenoptychius, Agassiz; Ctenopetalus, Agassiz; and Harpacodus,  Agassiz. Annals and Magazine of Natural History, (Series 5), 8: 424–427
Davis, J.W. (1881) Notes on the fish-remains of the bone-bed at Aust, near Bristol; with the description of some new genera and species. Quarterly Journal of the Geological Society of London, 37: 414–426 online here
Davis, J.W. (1882) On Diodontopsodus, Davis, a new genus of fossil fishes from the Mountain Limestone, at Richmond, in Yorkshire. Abstract. Report of the British Association for the Advancement of Science, 51: 646
Davis, J.W. (1883) On the fossil fishes of the Carboniferous Limestone Series of Great Britain. Scientific Transactions of the Royal Dublin Society, Series 2, 1: 327–548
Davis, J.W. (1884) On some remains of fossil fishes from the Yoredale Series at Leyburn in Wensleydale. Quarterly Journal of the Geological Society of London, 40: 614–635 online here
Davis, J.W. (1887) The fossil fishes of the chalk of Mount Lebanon, in Syria. Scientific Transactions of the Royal Dublin Society, 2 (3): 457–636, pl. 14–38. Online here Communicated by William Cole, 3rd Earl of Enniskillen.
Davis, J.W. (1887) Note on a fossil species of Chlamydoselachus. Proceedings of the Zoological Society of London, 1887: 542–544
Davis, J.W. (1888) Note on a species of Scymnus from the upper Tertiary formation of New Zealand. Geological Magazine, decade 3, 5: 315–316
Davis, J.W. (1888) On fossil fish-remains from the Tertiary and Cretaceo-Tertiary formations of New-Zealand. Scientific Transactions of the Royal Dublin Society, 4 (2): 1–48, 7 pl.
Davis, J.W. (1890) On the fossil fish of the Cretaceous formations of Scandinavia. Scientific Transactions of the Royal Dublin Society, 2 (4): 363–434, pl. 38 Online here
Davis, J.W. (1892) On the fossil fish-remains of the coal measures of the British Islands. Part I. Pleuracanthidae Scientific Transactions of the Royal Dublin Society, 2 (4): 703–748 Online here
Davis, J.W.(1899) Fossil Fish-remains from Carboniferous Shales at Cultra, Co. Down, Ireland Proceedings of the Yorkshire Geological and Polytechnic Society, 11, 332-334

Taxa described by Davis
Taxa described by Davis include 
Cheirothrix lewisii
Rhinobatos intermedius Davis 1887
Rhinobatos latus Davis 1887
Rhinobatos tenuirostris Davis 1887
Anodontacanthus,  Davis, 1881
Ctenacanthus minor Davis, 1879
Gyracanthus denticulatus Davis, 1880
Strepsodus brockbanki Davis, 1891.
Diodontopsodus Davis, 1882 
Exocoetoides Davis, 1887

References
Anon 1904 The History of the Collections Contained in the Natural History Departments of the British Museum, Volume 1 Trustees of the British Museum
Obituary in The Naturalist

1846 births
1893 deaths
English palaeontologists
Members of the Yorkshire Naturalists' Union